George Francis Meyer (August 3, 1909 – January 3, 1992) was a Major League Baseball second baseman who played for the Chicago White Sox in .

External links

1909 births
1992 deaths
Chicago White Sox players
Baseball players from Illinois
Major League Baseball second basemen